Clifton-Metropolitan Hotel was a historic building located in downtown Davenport, Iowa, United States.  The property was listed on the National Register of Historic Places in 1983.  It has since been torn down and it was delisted from the National Register in 1997  The site on the corner of Main Street and River Drive, along with the neighboring site of the former Schauder Hotel, is now a public parking structure.

History
The building was originally the G.L. Davenport store, which began business there in 1841.  It was later the location of the Clifton-Metropolitan Hotel.  The Clifton was part of the second phase of hotel construction and expansion in the city of Davenport, which lasted from about the time of the American Civil War until the early 20th-century.  It was in business for several decades and lasted longer than most of its contemporaries.  There is some evidence that the building may have housed a brothel after its service as a hotel.  It was located on the edge of the city's notorious Bucktown District.  Eventually, it became part of the Petersen Harned and Von Maur Department Store complex, where it was used for storage.  The property passed to the President Riverboat Casino, who had plans for the building that never materialized.

Demolition
The President Riverboat Casino planned to demolish the building in 1995 and threatened to sue if the preservationists voted to save the building. At the time it was torn down, to make way for the parking structure, it was the oldest commercial building in the city. The city ultimately rejected landmark status 8-to-1 and the building was demolished in November 1995.

References

Commercial buildings completed in 1841
Former buildings and structures in Davenport, Iowa
National Register of Historic Places in Davenport, Iowa
Hotel buildings on the National Register of Historic Places in Iowa
Former National Register of Historic Places in Iowa
Greek Revival architecture in Iowa
Demolished buildings and structures in Iowa
Buildings and structures demolished in 1995